This is a list of electoral division results for the Australian 1949 federal election.

Overall
This section is an excerpt from 1949 Australian federal election § House of Representatives

New South Wales

Banks 
This section is an excerpt from Electoral results for the Division of Banks § 1949

Barton 
This section is an excerpt from Electoral results for the Division of Barton § 1949

Bennelong 
This section is an excerpt from Electoral results for the Division of Bennelong § 1949

Blaxland 
This section is an excerpt from Electoral results for the Division of Blaxland § 1949

Bradfield 
This section is an excerpt from Electoral results for the Division of Bradfield § 1949

Calare 
This section is an excerpt from Electoral results for the Division of Calare § 1949

Cook 
This section is an excerpt from Electoral results for the Division of Cook (1906–1955) § 1949

Cowper 
This section is an excerpt from Electoral results for the Division of Cowper § 1949

Cunningham 
This section is an excerpt from Electoral results for the Division of Cunningham § 1949

Dalley 
This section is an excerpt from Electoral results for the Division of Dalley § 1949

Darling 
This section is an excerpt from Electoral results for the Division of Darling § 1949

East Sydney 
This section is an excerpt from Electoral results for the Division of East Sydney § 1949

Eden-Monaro 
This section is an excerpt from Electoral results for the Division of Eden-Monaro § 1949

Evans 
This section is an excerpt from Electoral results for the Division of Evans § 1949

Farrer 
This section is an excerpt from Electoral results for the Division of Farrer § 1949

Grayndler 
This section is an excerpt from Electoral results for the Division of Grayndler § 1949

Gwydir 
This section is an excerpt from Electoral results for the Division of Gwydir § 1949

Hume 
This section is an excerpt from Electoral results for the Division of Hume § 1949

Hunter 
This section is an excerpt from Electoral results for the Division of Hunter § 1949

Kingsford Smith 
This section is an excerpt from Electoral results for the Division of Kingsford Smith § 1949

Lang 
This section is an excerpt from Electoral results for the Division of Lang § 1949

Lawson 
This section is an excerpt from Electoral results for the Division of Lawson § 1949

Lowe 
This section is an excerpt from Electoral results for the Division of Lowe § 1949

Lyne 
This section is an excerpt from Electoral results for the Division of Lyne § 1949

Macarthur 
This section is an excerpt from Electoral results for the Division of Macarthur § 1949

Mackellar 
This section is an excerpt from Electoral results for the Division of Mackellar § 1949

Macquarie 
This section is an excerpt from Electoral results for the Division of Macquarie § 1949

Martin 
This section is an excerpt from Electoral results for the Division of Martin § 1949

Mitchell 
This section is an excerpt from Electoral results for the Division of Mitchell § 1949

New England 
This section is an excerpt from Electoral results for the Division of New England § 1949

Newcastle 
This section is an excerpt from Electoral results for the Division of Newcastle § 1949

North Sydney 
This section is an excerpt from Electoral results for the Division of North Sydney § 1949

Parkes 
This section is an excerpt from Electoral results for the Division of Parkes (1901–1969) § 1949

Parramatta 
This section is an excerpt from Electoral results for the Division of Parramatta § 1949

Paterson 
This section is an excerpt from Electoral results for the Division of Paterson § 1949

Phillip 
This section is an excerpt from Electoral results for the Division of Phillip § 1949

Reid
This section is an excerpt from Electoral results for the Division of Reid § 1949

Richmond 
This section is an excerpt from Electoral results for the Division of Richmond § 1949

Riverina 
This section is an excerpt from Electoral results for the Division of Riverina § 1949

Robertson 
This section is an excerpt from Electoral results for the Division of Robertson § 1949

Shortland 
This section is an excerpt from Electoral results for the Division of Shortland § 1949

St George 
This section is an excerpt from Electoral results for the Division of St George § 1949

Warringah 
This section is an excerpt from Electoral results for the Division of Warringah § 1949

Watson 
This section is an excerpt from Electoral results for the Division of Watson (1934–1969) § 1949

Wentworth 
This section is an excerpt from Electoral results for the Division of Wentworth § 1949

Werriwa 
This section is an excerpt from Electoral results for the Division of Werriwa § 1949

West Sydney 
This section is an excerpt from Electoral results for the Division of West Sydney § 1949

Victoria

Balaclava 
This section is an excerpt from Electoral results for the Division of Balaclava § 1949

Ballaarat 
This section is an excerpt from Electoral results for the Division of Ballarat § 1949

Batman 
This section is an excerpt from Electoral results for the Division of Batman § 1949

Bendigo 
This section is an excerpt from Electoral results for the Division of Bendigo § 1949

Burke 
This section is an excerpt from Electoral results for the Division of Burke (1949–1955) § 1949

Chisholm 
This section is an excerpt from Electoral results for the Division of Chisholm § 1949

Corangamite 
This section is an excerpt from Electoral results for the Division of Corangamite § 1949

Corio 
This section is an excerpt from Electoral results for the Division of Corio § 1949

Darebin 
This section is an excerpt from Electoral results for the Division of Darebin § 1949

Deakin 
This section is an excerpt from Electoral results for the Division of Deakin § 1949

Fawkner 
This section is an excerpt from Electoral results for the Division of Fawkner § 1949

Flinders 
This section is an excerpt from Electoral results for the Division of Flinders § 1949

Gellibrand 
This section is an excerpt from Electoral results for the Division of Gellibrand § 1949

Gippsland 
This section is an excerpt from Electoral results for the Division of Gippsland § 1949

Henty 
This section is an excerpt from Electoral results for the Division of Henty § 1949

Higgins 
This section is an excerpt from Electoral results for the Division of Higgins § 1949

Higinbotham 
This section is an excerpt from Electoral results for the Division of Higinbotham § 1949

Hoddle 
This section is an excerpt from Electoral results for the Division of Hoddle § 1949

Indi 
This section is an excerpt from Electoral results for the Division of Indi § 1949

Isaacs 
This section is an excerpt from Electoral results for the Division of Isaacs (1949–1969) § 1949

Kooyong 
This section is an excerpt from Electoral results for the Division of Kooyong § 1949

La Trobe 
This section is an excerpt from Electoral results for the Division of La Trobe § 1949

Lalor 
This section is an excerpt from Electoral results for the Division of Lalor § 1949

Mallee 
This section is an excerpt from Electoral results for the Division of Mallee § 1949

Maribyrnong 
This section is an excerpt from Electoral results for the Division of Maribyrnong § 1949

McMillan 
This section is an excerpt from Electoral results for the Division of McMillan § 1949

Melbourne 
This section is an excerpt from Electoral results for the Division of Melbourne § 1949

Melbourne Ports 
This section is an excerpt from Electoral results for the Division of Melbourne Ports § 1949

Murray 
This section is an excerpt from Electoral results for the Division of Murray § 1949

Wannon 
This section is an excerpt from Electoral results for the Division of Wannon § 1949

Wills 
This section is an excerpt from Electoral results for the Division of Wills § 1949

Wimmera 
This section is an excerpt from Electoral results for the Division of Wimmera § 1949

Yarra 
This section is an excerpt from Electoral results for the Division of Yarra § 1949

Queensland

Bowman 
This section is an excerpt from Electoral results for the Division of Bowman § 1949

Brisbane 
This section is an excerpt from Electoral results for the Division of Brisbane § 1949

Capricornia 
This section is an excerpt from Electoral results for the Division of Capricornia § 1949

Darling Downs 
This section is an excerpt from Electoral results for the Division of Darling Downs § 1949

Dawson 
This section is an excerpt from Electoral results for the Division of Dawson § 1949

Fisher 
This section is an excerpt from Electoral results for the Division of Fisher § 1949

Griffith 
This section is an excerpt from Electoral results for the Division of Griffith § 1949

Herbert 
This section is an excerpt from Electoral results for the Division of Herbert § 1949

Kennedy 
This section is an excerpt from Electoral results for the Division of Kennedy § 1949

Leichhardt 
This section is an excerpt from Electoral results for the Division of Leichhardt § 1949

Lilley 
This section is an excerpt from Electoral results for the Division of Lilley § 1949

Maranoa 
This section is an excerpt from Electoral results for the Division of Maranoa § 1949

McPherson 
This section is an excerpt from Electoral results for the Division of McPherson § 1949

Moreton 
This section is an excerpt from Electoral results for the Division of Moreton § 1949

Oxley 
This section is an excerpt from Electoral results for the Division of Oxley § 1949

Petrie 
This section is an excerpt from Electoral results for the Division of Petrie § 1949

Ryan 
This section is an excerpt from Electoral results for the Division of Ryan § 1949

Wide Bay 
This section is an excerpt from Electoral results for the Division of Wide Bay § 1949

South Australia

Adelaide 
This section is an excerpt from Electoral results for the Division of Adelaide § 1949

Angas 
This section is an excerpt from Electoral results for the Division of Angas (1949–1977) § 1949

Barker 
This section is an excerpt from Electoral results for the Division of Barker § 1949

Boothby 
This section is an excerpt from Electoral results for the Division of Boothby § 1949

Grey 
This section is an excerpt from Electoral results for the Division of Grey § 1949

Hindmarsh 
This section is an excerpt from Electoral results for the Division of Hindmarsh § 1949

Kingston 
This section is an excerpt from Electoral results for the Division of Kingston § 1949

Port Adelaide 
This section is an excerpt from Electoral results for the Division of Port Adelaide § 1949

Sturt 
This section is an excerpt from Electoral results for the Division of Sturt § 1949

Wakefield 
This section is an excerpt from Electoral results for the Division of Wakefield § 1949

Western Australia

Canning 
This section is an excerpt from Electoral results for the Division of Canning § 1949

Curtin 
This section is an excerpt from Electoral results for the Division of Curtin § 1949

Forrest 
This section is an excerpt from Electoral results for the Division of Forrest § 1949

Fremantle 
This section is an excerpt from Electoral results for the Division of Fremantle § 1949

Kalgoorlie 
This section is an excerpt from Electoral results for the Division of Kalgoorlie § 1949

Moore 
This section is an excerpt from Electoral results for the Division of Moore § 1949

Perth 
This section is an excerpt from Electoral results for the Division of Perth § 1949

Swan 
This section is an excerpt from Electoral results for the Division of Swan § 1949

Tasmania

Bass 
This section is an excerpt from Electoral results for the Division of Bass § 1949

Darwin 
This section is an excerpt from Electoral results for the Division of Darwin § 1949

Denison 
This section is an excerpt from Electoral results for the Division of Denison § 1949

Franklin 
This section is an excerpt from Electoral results for the Division of Franklin § 1949

Wilmot 
This section is an excerpt from Electoral results for the Division of Wilmot § 1949

Territories

Australian Capital Territory 
This section is an excerpt from Electoral results for the Division of Australian Capital Territory § 1949

Northern Territory 
This section is an excerpt from Electoral results for the Division of Northern Territory § 1949

See also 

 Candidates of the 1949 Australian federal election
 Members of the Australian House of Representatives, 1949–1951

References 

House of Representatives 1949